Pisye or Pitye (Πίτυη) was a town of ancient Caria.

Its site is located near Yeşilyurt (formerly, Pissiköy), Asiatic Turkey.

References

Populated places in ancient Caria
Former populated places in Turkey